Smolne may refer to the following places in Poland:
Smolne, Lower Silesian Voivodeship (south-west Poland)
Smolne, Pomeranian Voivodeship (north Poland)
Smolne, West Pomeranian Voivodeship (north-west Poland)